Romeo Nedelcu (born 14 November 1939) is a Romanian bobsledder. He competed in the two-man event at the 1968 Winter Olympics.

References

1939 births
Living people
Romanian male bobsledders
Olympic bobsledders of Romania
Bobsledders at the 1968 Winter Olympics
Sportspeople from Bucharest